Zameen, alternatively spelled Zamin, is an Urdu novel by Pakistani novelist and short story writer Khadija Mastoor. The novel was published posthumously by Idara-e-Farogh-e-Urdu in 1983. Daisy Rockwell, PhD, translated it into English and released it in July 2019 under the title A Promised Land. Zameen depicts the economic and political upheaval that entailed the partition of British India. It begins at the final setting of Mastoor's first novel Aangan – the Walton refugee camp in Lahore. Consequently, it is sometimes considered an extension of Aangan, however, Rockwell has clarified that it is not a narrative sequel, rather a philosophical and thematic follow-up. It is considered a political allegory and a women-centric historical account of Pakistan's independence.

Characters 
Zameen main characters are:
 Sajida – the intelligent protagonist. After migrating to Pakistan, she lives with her father at a refugee camp.
 Nazim – a Department of Rehabilitation official at the camp who insists Sajida to live at his home with him and his family
 Saleema – a passionate student, Nazim's female cousin
 Kazim – Nazim's amoral and feudalistic brother

Reception 
Critic and fiction writer Muhammad Ahsan Farooqi found the novel rich in Mastoor's style of dialogue writing and exposition. Writing about Zameen in his essay "" he said, "Where she has used other literary devices to develop the story and the characters against a specific backdrop, she has also taken great care of speech and style." Farooqi compared her storytelling skill to that of Jane Austen.

In his book, Muhammad Naseem said that the author had presented the issues of the establishment of Pakistan and the migration with impartiality and skill. She has very well represented the feelings of a woman. Ahmad Nadeem Qasmi wrote in his article, "The way Aangan Aaliya and Zameen Sajida dominate their environment, could it be Khadija's own personality trait? But in my opinion, even more than her personality, it is Khadija's subconscious desire to see the woman dignified, which is embodied in Aaliya and Sajida."

Shaista Hameed attested that the author wrote "every single line of her novels with blood, sweat, and tears". The novel is considered a specimen of her skill of making prose memorable, without being idealistic or mixing lies in it.

Reviewing A Promised Land in Dawn, Asif Farrukhi called Zameen a "neglected novel", while Scroll.in called it "Khadija Mastur's neglected masterpiece" when it republished the article. Lalitha Subramanian noted in the Deccan Herald the absence of biterness towards India and recommending the novel to Indian readers, appreciated the Pakistani author's regard for Mahatma Gandhi.

References

External links 
 Zameen at Goodreads

Urdu-language novels
Novels published posthumously
Urdu-language fiction
Pakistani fiction
1983 novels
Novels set in the 1940s
Pakistani historical novels
Pakistani social novels
National Language Promotion Department books
Sang-e-Meel Publications books
Novels by Khadija Mastoor
Fiction set in the 1940s
Novels about families
Novels about nationalism
Womanist novels
1983 Pakistani novels
Novels set in Lahore